Ahmed Hijazi, sometimes spelled Ahmad or Hegazi, may refer to:

 Ahmed Hijazi (poet) (born 1935), Egyptian contemporary poet
 Ahmed Hijazi (cartoonist) (1936–2011), Egyptian satirical cartoonist
 Ahmed Hijazi, alias of Kamal Derwish (1973–2002), American terrorist killed by CIA
 Ahmad Hijazi (born 1994), Lebanese professional footballer
 Ahmed Hegazi (footballer) (born 1991), Egyptian professional footballer
 Ahmed Hegazi (actor) (1935–2002), Egyptian actor